Marianne "Janny" (or "Jannie") Brandes-Brilleslijper (24 October 1916 – 15 August 2003) was a Dutch Holocaust survivor and one of the last people to see Anne Frank. She is the sister of singer Lin Jaldati (born Rebekka Brilleslijper; 1912–1988). Both Brandes-Brilleslijper and Jaldati (nicknamed "Lientje") were in the Westerbork, Auschwitz and Bergen-Belsen concentration camps with Anne and Anne's older sister Margot Frank.

Life
Brandes-Brilleslijper was born Marianne Brilleslijper in Amsterdam on 24 October 1916, the middle of three children of Fijtje (née Gerritse) and Joseph Brilleslijper. In 1939, she married Cornelis Teunis "Bob" Brandes (1912–1998), and they had two children: Robert and Liselotte Dolores. After the Nazis invaded the Netherlands, Janny and Bob, along with Lientje, began to work in the Resistance. Janny kept Jewish people hidden in her home, and she never officially registered as a Jew. 

The Nazis wanted to arrest Janny and her family because of her involvement in the resistance. While her husband and children escaped, Janny and Lientje were arrested, in the summer of 1944, and were transported to the Westerbork transit camp. In Westerbork, they were listed as "criminals" and had to work in the work barracks. In those barracks, Janny and Lientje met Anne and Margot and befriended them.

From Westerbork, Janny, Lientje, and the Franks were transported to Auschwitz. Janny and Lientje were later transported to the Bergen-Belsen concentration camp, where Anne and Margot were also transported in October 1944. Janny, who was made a nurse in the camp, took care of the ill prisoners. In March 1945, Anne and Margot died within a few days of each other. Janny and Lientje buried them in the mass graves at the camp.

After the war, Brandes-Brilleslijper was reunited with her husband and children. Through the Red Cross, she contacted Otto Frank and informed him about the deaths of his daughters, Anne and Margot. She returned to Amsterdam, where she grew up.

Brandes-Brilleslijper told her story about Anne and Margot's final days for the first time in the International Emmy Award winning documentary movie The Last Seven Months of Anne Frank (1988), directed by Dutch filmmaker Willy Lindwer.

Brandes-Brilleslijper died of heart failure in Amsterdam on 15 August, 2003 at the age of 86. She is buried at Zorgvlied cemetery.

See also
 People associated with Anne Frank

References

1916 births
2003 deaths
Dutch Jews
Resistance members from Amsterdam
Women in World War II
Jewish concentration camp survivors
Anne Frank